This is the progression of world record improvements of the triple jump W80 division of Masters athletics.

Key

References

Masters Athletics Triple Jump list

Masters athletics world record progressions
Triple